The  mixed pairs BC3 boccia event at the 2016 Summer Paralympics was contested from 10 September to 13 September at Sambodromo in Rio de Janeiro. 8 teams of competitors took part.

The event structure was amended from the 2012 event, with pool stages added. The top two teams from each of two pools then entered into a quarterfinal single-elimination stage, with the losing semifinalists playing off for bronze.

Elimination stages

Pool stages

Pool A

Pool B

* : Tie for first broken on head to head record, relevant matches in bold.
**: Tie for third broken on head to head record, relevant matches in bold.

References

Pairs BC3